The 1946–47 Michigan Wolverines men's basketball team represented the University of Michigan in intercollegiate basketball during the 1946–47 season.  The team finished the season in 5th place in the Big Ten Conference with an overall record of 12–8 and 6–6 against conference opponents.

Osborne Cowles was in his first year as the team's head coach.  Mack Supronowicz was the team's leading scorer with 228 points in 20 games for an average of 11.4 points per game.  Pete Elliott was the team captain.

Statistical leaders

References

Michigan
Michigan Wolverines men's basketball seasons
Michigan Wolverines basketball
Michigan Wolverines basketball